Haissem Hassan (born 8 February 2002) is a French professional footballer who plays as a forward for Spanish club Villarreal CF B.

Club career
Hassan signed his first professional contract with Châteauroux on 1 June 2018 at the age of 16. He made his professional debut with Châteauroux in a 0–0 Ligue 2 tie with Paris FC on 19 October 2018.

On 2 October 2020, Hassan signed a four-year contract with Villarreal CF, being initially assigned to the reserves in Segunda División B. The following 9 August, he moved to Segunda División side CD Mirandés on a one-year loan deal.

International career
Hassan was born in Paris, France to an Egyptian father and Tunisian mother. He is a youth international for France.

Career statistics

Club

Honors
France U17
FIFA U-17 World Cup third place: 2019

References

External links
 
 
 
 
 

2002 births
Living people
French people of Egyptian descent
French sportspeople of Tunisian descent
Footballers from Paris
French footballers
Association football forwards
Ligue 2 players
Championnat National 3 players
LB Châteauroux players
Segunda División players
Segunda División B players
Villarreal CF B players
CD Mirandés footballers
French expatriate footballers
French expatriate sportspeople in Spain
Expatriate footballers in Spain
France youth international footballers